Bizjan may refer to:
 Bizjan-e Olya
 Bizjan-e Sofla